Chotard and Company (French: Chotard et Cie) is a 1933 French comedy film directed by Jean Renoir and starring Jeanne Boitel, Fernand Charpin and Jeanne Loury. It was released by the French subsidiary of Universal Pictures.

Cast
 Jeanne Boitel as Reine 
 Fernand Charpin as Chotard
 Georges Pomiès as Julien Collinet
 Jeanne Loury as Marie Chotard
 Tré-Ki as Augustine
 Dignimont as Parpaillon
 Louis Seigner as Ducasse, le capitaine 
 Louis Tunc as Le sous-préfet
 Max Dalban as Le commis
 Robert Seller as Le commandant 
 René Arzic
 Jacques Becker
 Georges D'Arnoux as Un employé de l'épicerie
 Freddie Johnson as Le musicien
 Fabien Loris as Un invité du bal

References

Bibliography 
 Christopher Faulkner. The Social Cinema of Jean Renoir. Princeton University Press, 2014.

External links 
 

1933 films
1930s French-language films
Films directed by Jean Renoir
1933 comedy films
French comedy films
French black-and-white films
1930s French films